Clube Desportivo Ferroviário do Huambo, formerly Ferrovia Sport Clube de Nova Lisboa is an Angolan football club based in Huambo, in central Angola.

League & Cup Positions

Manager history and performance

History
In 1951 and 1974 the team has won the Angolan provincial championship.

Honours
Angolan League: 1951, 1974

Stadium
Ferroviário do Huambo is the owner of the Estádio do Ferroviário do Huambo best known as Estádio dos Kurikutelas.

Players

References

External links
Facebook profile
CampeoesdoFutebol.com—
Futebol de Angola.blogspot—

Football clubs in Angola
Huambo
Association football clubs established in 1930
1930s establishments in Angola
Railway association football teams